Germán Frers may refer to:

 Germán Frers (born 1941), Argentine naval architect
 Germán Frers (sailor) (1899–1986), Argentine sailor